Serruria williamsii, commonly known as the king spiderhead, is a flower-bearing shrub that belongs to the genus Serruria and forms part of the fynbos. The plant is native to the Western Cape and only occurs in the Riviersonderend Mountains.

The leaves of the plant are whorled below the flowerhead stalk, and are curved upwards. The flowerheads are a panicle of lax (i.e. loose) racemes.

See also
: lax

References

External links 

williamsii
Flora of the Cape Provinces